Primonatalus prattae is a fossil bat species from the family of the Natalidae which lived in the early Miocene in Florida. This animal, the only species of the genus Primonatalus, is known from 32 fossils (upper and lower jaws, isolated teeth and various other bones).

References 

Mammals described in 2003
Miocene
Natalidae
Prehistoric bat genera